Practising Law Institute (PLI) is a non-profit continuing legal education (CLE) organization chartered by the Regents of the University of the State of New York. Founded in 1933, the company organizes and provides CLE programs around the world. Its programs are held in multiple locations including New York, California, Illinois, Washington D.C., Georgia, Massachusetts, Texas, Pennsylvania, London, and Hong Kong.

Programs are also offered in various formats, including live webcasts, MP3s, and on-demand videos. PLI's headquarters are located in New York City, New York; it also maintains an office in San Francisco, California.

History
Founded in 1933, PLI was established to offer courses in the practice of law for lawyers recently admitted to the bar and/or those seeking to learn the elements of practicing in the field. As the country was seeing a transition from apprenticeship to formal law school education, a New York City lawyer by the name of Harold P. Seligson recognized the need for practical training in law and originated a series of lectures called the "Practising Law Courses." These lectures would be the germination of the full-fledged Institute that exists today under the banner of Practising Law Institute (PLI).

By 1939, the Institute had been formally chartered by the Regents of the State of New York. It was able to take advantage of certain historical forces, including the New Deal and the federal regulation of business activity it inspired. The Securities Act of 1933 and the Securities Exchange Act of 1934, for example, initiated a new specialization in the law. This new specialization in turn created a need for a new kind of continuing legal education, which we see in practice today.

As a not-for-profit educational organization, PLI offers pro bono programs in numerous practice areas, as well as pro bono scholarships for individuals and organizations including lawyers, legal services and nonprofit organizations, and students in need of assistance. In 2012, PLI awarded over 26,000 scholarships.

In mid-2020, Craig Miller, Senior Vice President for Membership and Accreditation, was appointed Interim President of the organization by PLI's Board of Trustees. He took on the role from Anita Carr Shapiro, PLI's first woman president, who was appointed in 2015. Ms. Shapiro died in September 2020.

Mission
Practising Law Institute's mission statement, as stated on its website:

Notable faculty and authors
 Robert Khuzami
 Preet Bharara
 Mary Schapiro
 Burt Neuborne
 Ted Wells
 Joshua Ballance

References

External links
 Practising Law Institute Web Site
PLI Press Publishing Division 
 Securities Law Practice Center
 Patent Law Practice Center
 PLI Librarian

Legal education
Legal research institutes
Education in New York (state)